This is a list of films produced by the Ollywood film industry based in Bhubaneshwar and Cuttack in 2001:

A-Z

References

2001
Ollywood
2000s in Orissa
 
2001 in Indian cinema